Gorga, also known as Gorga Cilento, is a southern Italian village and the only hamlet (frazione) of Stio, a municipality in the province of Salerno, Campania. As of 2016, its population was 160.

History
The village was originally settled in the 12th century by Basilian monks, and grew as a village during the Middle Ages. Part of Magliano Vetere as a casale, it was aggregated to the municipality of Stio in early 19th century.

Geography
Located in the middle of Cilento and transcluded into its national park, Gorga is a hill village that spans below Le Corne mountain, next to the source of the river Alento, and 3 km north of Stio. It is 4 km far from Magliano Nuovo, 6 from Magliano Vetere, 8 from Piano Vetrale,  Gioi and Campora, and 16 from Vallo della Lucania.

Main sights
The principal sights of Gorga are the ruins of the church Grancia di San Lucido (12th century), the central church of St. Januarius; and the Chapel of Our Lady of the Health (Madonna della Sanità, 16th century), situated in the locality of Oliceta.

Personalities
Raffaele Lettieri (1881–1957), politician and academic
Antonino Maria Stromillo (1786–1858), Catholic bishop, first one of the Diocese of Caltanissetta

See also
Cilentan dialect

References

External links

Frazioni of the Province of Salerno
Localities of Cilento